Nathan Long is the name of:

 Nathan Long (author), American fantasy author
 Nathan Long (rugby league) (born 1973), Australian rugby league player